Wonderland Avenue Elementary School is a public elementary school in the Laurel Canyon neighborhood of Los Angeles, California. Ranked one of the best elementary schools in California, Wonderland is known for its gifted magnet program and high number of prominent parents in the entertainment industry.

Notable alumni 
 James Badge Dale, American actor

References 

Elementary schools in Los Angeles County, California